Geoscientist may refer to:

Geoscientist (magazine), the official membership magazine of The Geological Society of London
Geoscientist, a person studying Earth or other planets using Earth science
Geologist, a scientist who studies the solid, liquid, and gaseous matter that constitutes the Earth and other terrestrial planets
Geochemist (see Geochemistry)
Geophysicist (see Geophysics)
Planetologist (see Planetary science)